Eyn-e Yebareh (also Romanized as ‘Eyn-e Yebāreh; also known as Shāveh-ye ‘Eyn-e Yebāreh) is a village in Azadeh Rural District, Moshrageh District, Ramshir County, Khuzestan Province, Iran. At the 2006 census, its population was 121, in 28 families.

References 

Populated places in Ramshir County